Mai Surrow (born 18 September 1992) is a Danish badminton player. In 2016, she won the mixed doubles titles at the Portugal International tournament partnered with Mikkel Mikkelsen. In May 2016, she and Mikkelsen lifted their second title as a pair in only their fourth tournament together at the Slovenia International tournament.

Achievements

BWF Grand Prix (1 runner-up) 
The BWF Grand Prix had two levels, the Grand Prix and Grand Prix Gold. It was a series of badminton tournaments sanctioned by the Badminton World Federation (BWF) and played between 2007 and 2017.

Mixed doubles

  BWF Grand Prix Gold tournament
  BWF Grand Prix tournament

BWF International Challenge/Series (10 titles, 10 runners-up) 
Women's  doubles

Mixed doubles

  BWF International Challenge tournament
  BWF International Series tournament
  BWF Future Series tournament

References

External links 
 

1992 births
Living people
People from Randers
Danish female badminton players
Sportspeople from the Central Denmark Region